The 11th running of the Omloop Het Nieuwsblad women's race in Belgium was held on 27 February 2016 and is widely regarded as the start of the Classics season. The race was won by the ruling world champion, Britain's Lizzie Armitstead, after a solo breakaway. Chantal Blaak won the sprint for second place ahead of Tiffany Cromwell. Armitstead’s win marks the first time a world champion has graced the top step of the podium at the Belgian Semi-Classic. The Omloop started and finished in Ghent, addressing several climbs in the Flemish Ardennes and covering .

Race
Nearly 200 riders set out for the 123 km. A nervous but inactive first half gives way for non-stop attacks over the climbs and cobbles that feature in the second half of the race. Jessie Daams (Lotto Soudal Ladies) rode away from the peloton for a short-lived solo effort and got a maximum advantage of 30 seconds over the peloton heading into the Wolvenberg. 40 km from the finish, the peloton pulled back Daams. On the Molenberg  Ellen van Dijk went away and opened the race again. She was caught on the Paddestraat cobbles.

Romy Kasper (Boels-Dolmans) led a trio of riders, part of a fragmented reduced bunch, just beyond the Paddestraat. Ten kilometres later with 20 km remaining Armitstead and Elvin rode away. The duo stretched out their advantage to 45 seconds but Armitstead was doing most of the work. When Armitstead stopped Cycling hard they rode at a low speed for a while. When there was a slight drag in the road Armitstead attacked and rode away from Gracie. Behind Armitstead the chase was disorganised. Rabo-Liv and Wiggle High5 eventually collaborated on the front, but their efforts weren’t enough to close the gap. Future attacks proved unnecessary. Armitstead maintained her advantage all the way to the line. Behind her Chantal Blaak delivered a one-two for Boels-Dolmans as she beat Tiffany Cromwell (Canyon-SRAM) in a reduced bunch sprint. The 22-rider chase group finished 29 seconds behind Armitstead.

Aftermath
Ellen van Dijk crashed during the race. She finished the race in arrears due to a bike change. After the race at the hospital it appears she had one broken and some bruised ribs.

See also
 2016 in women's road cycling

References

Omloop Het Nieuwsblad – Women's race
Omloop Het Nieuwsblad
Omloop Het Nieuwsblad
UCI